The bluntnose snake eel (Ophichthus apicalis, also known commonly as the pointed-tail snake-eel) is an eel in the family Ophichthidae (worm or snake eels). The author of the species is anonymous, but it has been referred to Edward Turner Bennett in 1830. It is a tropical, marine eel which is known from the Indo-Pacific, including Kenya, Madagascar, South Africa, Taiwan, Thailand, and the Philippines. It dwells at a maximum depth of 22 m, but also frequents shores. Males can reach a maximum total length of 45 cm.

References

Fish described in 1830
Ophichthus